This chronological list of managers of Falkirk Football Club comprises all those who have held the position of manager of the first team of Falkirk since the position was created in 1905. Prior to 1905 all manager appointments were assigned to the person in the position of club secretary. The most successful person to manage the club is Jim Jefferies, who won two First Division championships and one Scottish Challenge Cup during his five years as manager. However, Willie Nicol has managed Falkirk to their highest league ranking, runners-up in Scotland in both 1907–08 and 1909–10. To date, every person to have managed the club has been from the United Kingdom or Republic of Ireland.

Managers
This list does not include caretaker managers or those who managed in a temporary capacity

Information correct as of January 2022. Only competitive matches are counted

Notes

References

External links
 Falkirk's official website

Managers
 
Falkirk
Managers